When It Was Dark is a lost 1919 British silent drama film directed by Arrigo Bocchi and starring Manora Thew, Hayford Hobbs and George Butler. It is an adaptation of the 1903 novel of the same title by Guy Thorne.

Cast
 Manora Thew as Gertrude Hunt 
 Hayford Hobbs as Reverend Basil Gortrie 
 George Butler as Constantin Sharke 
 Charles Vane as Professor Llewellyn 
 Evelyn Harding as Princess Lontaine 
 Bert Wynne as Harold Spence 
 Peggy Patterson as Helen Byars 
 Judd Green as Father Riposi 
 Arthur Walcott as Governor

References

Bibliography
 Low, Rachael. History of the British Film, 1918-1929. George Allen & Unwin, 1971.

External links

1919 films
1919 drama films
British silent feature films
British drama films
Films based on British novels
Films directed by Arrigo Bocchi
British black-and-white films
1910s English-language films
1910s British films
Silent drama films